The 2011 Belarusian Premier League was the 21st season of top-tier football in Belarus. It began in April and ended in November 2011. BATE Borisov were the defending champions.

Teams

Partizan Minsk were relegated to the Belarusian First League after finishing the 2010 season in last place, ending a seven-year tenure in the league. They were replaced by 2010 First League champions Gomel, who make their immediate return to the highest football league of Belarus. Torpedo Zhodino as 11th-placed team had to compete in the relegation/promotion playoffs against First League runners-up SKVICH Minsk. They successfully retained their Premier League spot after defeating SKVICH 3–1 on aggregate. In early 2011 they were renamed to Torpedo-BelAZ Zhodino.

Team summaries

League table

Relegation playoffs
Vitebsk will play a two-legged relegation play-off against Partizan Minsk, the runners-up of the 2011 Belarusian First League for one spot in the 2012 Premier League.

Results
Each team will play three times against every other team for a total of 33 matches.

First and second round

Third round

Top goalscorers

Updated to games played on 27 November 2011 Source: football.by

Awards

Player of the month

See also
2011 Belarusian First League
2010–11 Belarusian Cup

References

External links
 Official site 

Belarusian Premier League seasons
1
Belarus
Belarus